"Beat of Broken Hearts" is a song by Swedish singer Klara Hammarström. It was performed in Melodifestivalen 2021 and made it to the 13 March final.

Charts

References

2021 songs
2021 singles
Melodifestivalen songs of 2021
Songs written by David Kreuger
Songs written by Fredrik Kempe